Henry A. Hargreaves, Ph.D. (1928-2017) was a prolific Canadian science fiction writer. Originally from Bronx, N.Y., Hargreaves was a pioneer of Canadian short fiction as well as having an academic career that culminated with him retiring as a professor emeritus of English Literature at the University of Alberta.

His short fiction was collected in one of Canadian science fiction's earliest anthologies: North By 2000, published in 1975 and was re-issued as North by 2000+ in 2012 with additional material, with such short stories as "Fore" - Eight - Sixteen, In His Moccasins, Infinite Variation, and 2020 Vision.

Hargreaves released an introspective memoir Growing Up Bronx: A Memoir of my Shapers and Shakers in 2012.

In 2015, Hargreaves was inducted into the Canadian Science Fiction & Fantasy Association Hall of Fame, whilst living in retirement in Claresholm, Alberta, with his wife.

Hargreaves died on July 27, 2017. He was survived by his wife Margaret and his two daughters.

References

Canadian science fiction writers
Academic staff of the University of Alberta
1928 births
2017 deaths
20th-century Canadian writers
20th-century Canadian male writers